78 may refer to:

 78 (number)
 one of the years 78 BC, AD 78, 1978, 2078
 78 RPM phonograph (gramophone) record
 The 78, a proposed urban development in Chicago, Illinois, US

See also
 '78 (disambiguation)
 
 List of highways numbered 78